Miles Stephen Hunt (born 29 July 1966) is an English singer, songwriter and guitarist. He fronts the alternative rock band The Wonder Stuff.

Early life
His father was a union official for the TGWU. In the 1970s, his father was based at Derby, and they lived in Etwall, Derbyshire, for four years, with Hunt attending the Etwall Junior School and his brother attending the John Port School.

Career
Hunt's first band (in which he played drums) was called From Eden, and featured future members of another successful Stourbridge group, Pop Will Eat Itself. After leaving this band he formed The Wonder Stuff and was their lead singer and principal songwriter until their split in 1994. He briefly presented 120 Minutes on MTV Europe until mid '95, when he formed a new band Vent 414 who failed to match the success of his former band. He toured as a solo performer for a time until he reformed The Wonder Stuff in 2000. The band continue to tour. He also co-wrote and sang the theme tune to the CBeebies television programme Underground Ernie.

Over the last few years he has written a series of printed and online articles for Nottingham-based culture magazine LeftLion . He also performed at the festival Bearded Theory on 15 May 2011 with Erica Nockalls.

Personal life
His former girlfriend was Helga Phillips who is now the partner of Jonn Penney, the lead singer of Ned's Atomic Dustbin, and who designed the distinctive covers of Ned's albums.

Hunt married radio DJ Mary Anne Hobbs in April 1990, in the London borough of Tower Hamlets. She was working for the NME at the time. They were married for five years.  He is currently single.  His uncle, Bill Hunt, was keyboard player in the Electric Light Orchestra and Wizzard.

Discography

Albums

Vent 414
 Vent 414  (1996)
 The Post Album Demos (2009)

Solo
 Miles Across America (1998)
 By The Time I Got To Jersey [also known as "Common Threads Live"] (1998)
 Hairy On The Inside (1999)
 MP3 Of The Month Club (2000)
 The Miles Hunt Club (2002)
 Interloper Live 2006 (2006)
 The Custodian (2018)
 The Custodian 2 (2021)
 Things Can Change (2022)

With Erica Nockalls
 Not An Exit (2007)
 Catching More Than We Miss (2009)
Shared [Various Artists  - includes 3 tracks by Miles and Erica] (2009)
Shared 2 [Various Artists  - includes 2 tracks by Miles and Erica] (2011)
Live 2010/11 (2011)
We Came Here To Work (2017)

Singles and EPs
 Fixer - Vent 414 (1996)
 Life Before You - Vent 414 (1996)
 Life's Great EP (2000)
 Five Songs EP (2000)
 Everything Is Not OK (2002)
 The Miles Hunt Club EP (2002)
 Stay Scared, Stay Tuned - with Erica Nockalls (2009)
 We Came Here To Work - with Erica Nockalls (2017)

References

External links
 Interview at Blueyonder
 Interview with Tasty Fanzine 
 Miles Hunt writes for LeftLion Magazine

1966 births
Living people
English rock guitarists
English male guitarists
English male singers
Musicians from the West Midlands (county)
Musicians from Birmingham, West Midlands
People from Marston Green
The Wonder Stuff members